Voice of Jamaica is the third studio album by Jamaican dancehall reggae artist Buju Banton. It was released on August 3, 1993 via Mercury Records/PolyGram and was his international debut. Its remastered and expanded edition was released in 2002 with additional tracks. Recorded in Kingston and New York City, the album is considered to be the one that introduced Banton to the world outside Jamaica, also bringing dancehall to the wider world.

Production was handled by Donovan Germain, Steely & Clevie, Dave Kelly, Bobby "Digital" Dixon, Busta Rhymes, Mikey Bennett and Sly Dunbar. It features guest appearances from Beres Hammond, Brian and Tony Gold, Busta Rhymes, Terry Ganzie, Tony Rebel and Wayne Wonder. The album peaked at number 159 on the Billboard 200 albums chart in the United States.

Music and lyrics 

Musically the album shows a wide range of reggae music, with rhythms that vary from mainly hardcore dancehall, to roots reggae, R&B and ragga hip hop. 

Lyrically it faces various personal, political, and cultural themes, including love, war, violence, police brutality, safe sex, poverty and spirituality.

Critical reception 

Jo-Ann Greene of AllMusic said that "This is the kind of album that leaves the listener breathless with amazement", also stating that "It's a superb album, and deserved every accolade it received.

Track listing

Charts

References

External links

1993 albums
PolyGram albums
Buju Banton albums
Mercury Records albums
Albums produced by Donovan Germain
Albums produced by Steely & Clevie
Albums produced by Dave Kelly (producer)
Albums produced by Bobby Digital (Jamaican producer)